Polycomb group RING finger protein 1, PCGF1, also known as NSPC1 or RNF68 is a RING finger domain protein that in humans is encoded by the PCGF1 gene.

PCGF1 is a component defining the non-canonical polycomb repressive complex 1.1 (ncPRC1) interacting with RING1A/B, RYBP, BCOR and KDM2B.  PCGF1-BCOR assembles via the ubiquitin-like RAWUL domain of PCGF1 and is recruited on the chromatin at KDM2B sites. Within the PRC1-like complex, PCGF1 regulates RING1B ubiquitin ligase activity that catalyzes the ubiquitination of Lys119 on histone H2A,  which then leads to recruitment of PRC2 and H3K27me3 to effectively initiate a polycomb domain and mediate gene repression.

References

Further reading